The Atoka meteorite is an L6 meteorite which fell to earth near Atoka, Oklahoma, in 1945. It weighs .

References

See also
 Glossary of meteoritics
 

Meteorites found in the United States
Geology of Oklahoma
1945 in Oklahoma